Zavodskoy may refer to:
Zavodskoy City District, Russia, name of several city districts in Russia
Zavodskoy (inhabited locality), name of several inhabited localities in Russia

See also

loosely translated as factory worker, or mill hand
 Zavodsky (disambiguation)